"Walking in Rhythm" is a smooth rhythm and blues and jazz song by the Blackbyrds. It tells the tale of a man who is passionate about getting   back home to his female companion.

The song charted in March 1975 and reached number six on the US Billboard Hot 100 and number twenty three on the UK Singles Chart in June. The tune was similarly well accepted by soft rock stations, reaching the top ten on the Billboard Easy Listening chart as well as on the Canadian Adult Contemporary chart.

"Walking in Rhythm" was the greatest hit of the Blackbyrds' four-year chart career. It was recorded in September 1974 at The Sound Factory in Los Angeles, California, and appeared on the group's second album Flying Start.

Chart performance

Weekly charts

Year-end charts

References

1974 songs
1975 singles
Rhythm and blues songs
Fantasy Records singles